The Donegal Junior Ladies Football Championship is an annual LGFA competition organised by Donegal LGFA among the third tier ladies football clubs in County Donegal.

The winner qualifies to represent the county in the Ulster Junior Club Ladies Football Championship, the winner of which progresses to the All-Ireland Junior Ladies Club Football Championship. The winning team receives the Junior Championship trophy, as of September 2022 this was unnamed.

Gaoth Dobhair are the 2022 champions. Gaoth Dobhair, St Naul's and MacCumhaill's are the most successful clubs, with two titles apiece.

Winners and finalists

Results by team

Finals listed by year

References

Explanatory notes

External links
 Official Donegal Website
 Donegal on Hoganstand
 Donegal Club GAA

Donegal GAA club championships